The 2018 Big East women's basketball tournament ended the 2017–18 season of Big East Conference women's basketball. The event was held March 3–6, 2018, at Wintrust Arena in Chicago. Big East regular-season co-champion and tournament host DePaul won the tournament and with it the Big East's automatic bid to the 2018 NCAA Division I women's basketball tournament.

Seeds

Schedule

Source:

Bracket

* denotes overtime period

See also

 2018 Big East men's basketball tournament

References

External links
Big East website

Big East women's basketball tournament
Basketball competitions in Chicago
2010s in Chicago
Big East tournament
Women's sports in Illinois
College basketball tournaments in Illinois